Yusuf Meilana Fuad Burhani (born 4 May 1998) is an Indonesian professional footballer who plays as a winger or left-back for Liga 1 club Persik Kediri.

Club career

Persik Kediri 
In 2017 Yusuf Meilana joined Persik Kediri in the Liga 2. On 25 November 2019 Persik successfully won the 2019 Liga 2 Final and promoted to Liga 1, after defeated Persita Tangerang 3–2 at the Kapten I Wayan Dipta Stadium, Gianyar.

Persekat Tegal (loan)
He was signed for Persekat Tegal to play in Liga 3 Regional route: Central Java in the 2018 season, on loan from Persik Kediri.

Honours

Club 
Persik Kediri
 Liga 3: 2018
 Liga 2: 2019

References

External links
 Yusuf Meilana at Soccerway
 Yusuf Meilana at Liga Indonesia

1998 births
Living people
Indonesian Muslims
Indonesian footballers
Persik Kediri players
Liga 1 (Indonesia) players
Liga 2 (Indonesia) players
People from Kediri (city)
Association football midfielders
Sportspeople from East Java